Tataurangi Tairuakena v  Mua Carr  [1927] NZGazLawRp 73; [1927] NZLR 688; (1927) 28 GLR 369 is a cited  case in New Zealand case law regarding property law.

References

1927 in New Zealand
Court of Appeal of New Zealand cases